Alison Bai and Jaimee Fourlis were the defending champions, but both players chose not to participate.

Irina Khromacheva and Anastasia Tikhonova won the title, defeating Robin Anderson and 
Hailey Baptiste 6–4, 7–5 in the final.

Seeds

Draw

References

External links 

 Draw
 Main draw

Canberra Tennis International - Women's doubles
2023 Women's doubles